Agbayani is a Filipino surname. Notable people with the surname include:

Bayani Agbayani (born 1969), Filipino actor, singer/songwriter of "Otso Otso"
Benny Agbayani (born 1971), American baseball player
Tetchie Agbayani (born 1961), Filipina actress
Tony Agbayani, American judge